Maifreda da Pirovano (died 1300) was an Italian mystic. 

She was a follower of the teachings of Guglielma. 

She was executed for heresy in Milan, having been convicted by the Inquisition.

References

13th-century births

1300 deaths

Year of birth unknown
People executed for heresy
People executed by burning
People executed by the Medieval Inquisition
13th-century Italian people
13th-century Italian women
13th-century executions